Higginsville is an unincorporated community in Hampshire County, West Virginia, United States. Higginsville once served as a stagecoach stop on the old Cumberland Road between Winchester and Cumberland, now known as the Slanesville Pike (West Virginia Secondary Route 3).

References 

Unincorporated communities in Hampshire County, West Virginia
Unincorporated communities in West Virginia